Set and setting, when referring to a psychedelic drug experience or the use of other psychoactive substances, means one's mindset (shortened to "set") and the physical and social environment (the "setting") in which the user has the experience. Set and setting are factors that can condition the effects of psychoactive substances: "Set" refers to the mental state a person brings to the experience, like thoughts, mood and expectations; "setting" to the physical and social environment. This is especially relevant for psychedelic experiences in either a therapeutic or recreational context.

History 
According to the 2018 book How to Change Your Mind by Michael Pollan, the concept of set and setting was observed by the "Johnny Appleseed" of LSD, Al Hubbard, visiting mushroom ceremonies in Mexico. The terms were used at least as early as 1958 by Ludwig von Bertalanffy and popularized by Timothy Leary in 1961, and became widely accepted by researchers in psychedelic therapy. Norman Zinberg also extensively discussed this in Drug, Set, and Setting: The Basis for Controlled Intoxicant Use (1984).

Due to the importance of setting in early psychedelic therapy, Hubbard introduced a "treatment space decorated to feel more like a home than a hospital", which came to be known as a "Hubbard Room". 
		 
In 1966, Timothy Leary conducted a series of experiments with dimethyltryptamine (DMT) with controlled set and setting. The aim was to see whether DMT, which had then been mostly thought of as a terror-inducing drug, could produce pleasant experiences under a supportive set and setting. It was found that it could.

Set and setting has also been investigated from a religious perspective.

The concept of set and setting has more recently been extended beyond psychedelics. Zinberg "sought to integrate the ideas of set and setting into a theory of harm reduction which examined not only psychedelic use but also drugs such as alcohol, cocaine, and heroin" and, more recently, the concept has been used to understand the circumstances of opioid overdoses.

Practice 
Social support networks have shown to be particularly important in the outcome of the psychedelic experience. They are able to control or guide the course of the experience, both consciously and subconsciously. Stress, fear, or a disagreeable material, social, cultural environment, including situations of racism or discrimination, may result in an unpleasant experience (bad trip). Conversely, a relaxed, curious person in a warm, comfortable and safe place is more likely to have a pleasant experience.

Research has shown that a curated music playlist can be part of a favourable setting. Set and setting are critical in the design of psychiatric facilities and modalities of psychedelic-assisted psychotherapies.

See also 
Altered state of consciousness
Counterculture of the 1960s
Responsible drug use
Sensory deprivation
Trip sitter
Out-of-body experience

References

Further reading 
 
 
 
 

Psychedelics, dissociatives and deliriants
Drug culture
Timothy Leary